Medak is a village in the Lika-Senj County, Croatia. The settlement is administered as a part of the city of Gospić.

In 1993, Medak was the site of Operation Medak Pocket.

Demographics
According to national census of 2011, population of the settlement is 62. This represents 11.01% of its pre-war population according to the 1991 census.

The 1991 census recorded that 94.32% of the village population were ethnic Serbs (531/563), 0.71% were Croats (4/563), 0.53% were Yugoslavs (3/563) while 4.44% were of other ethnic origin (25/563).

References 

Populated places in Lika-Senj County
Serb communities in Croatia